A Summer Best (sstylized as '''''SUMMER BEST) is the 6th compilation album by Japanese singer-songwriter Ayumi Hamasaki released on August 8, 2012. The album contains 24 old songs plus two new tracks - "You & Me" and "Happening here" - over 2 discs. The album is available in two versions: 2CD and 2CD+DVD.

It is her second compilation album (after A BEST 2 ~BLACK~) to not peak at number one on the Oricon chart.

Track listing

Charts
Oricon Sales Chart (Japan)

Notes

References

2012 compilation albums
Ayumi Hamasaki compilation albums
Japanese-language albums